Claud Alexander Barron, CSI, CIE, CVO, FRGS (22 December 1871 – 29 December 1948) was an administrator in British India. A member of the Indian Civil Service, he was Chief Commissioner of Delhi from 1918 to 1924.

References 

 "Mr. C. A. Barron", The Times, 30 December 1948, p. 6

1871 births
1948 deaths
Indian Civil Service (British India) officers
Companions of the Order of the Star of India
Companions of the Order of the Indian Empire
Commanders of the Royal Victorian Order
Fellows of the Royal Geographical Society
People educated at Aberdeen Grammar School
Alumni of the University of Aberdeen
Alumni of Clare College, Cambridge